Trucks were a short-lived British/Norwegian pop punk band, whose most popular release was the 2002 novelty single, "It's Just Porn Mum". The single was a top-five hit in Norway, and peaked at No. 35 on the UK Singles Chart. Its music video starred Ron Jeremy.

Members
Olav Iversen – vocals, guitar
Mark Remmington – guitar
Tor Bjarne Bjelland – drums
Steve Ryan – bass

Discography

Albums
Juice – released 26 May 2003
"Kickin'" (Shridhar Solanki, HP Aaserud, Geir Luedy, Trucks)
"The Village Bike" (Shridhar Solanki, HP Aaserud, Geir Luedy, Trucks)
"Monkey See, Monkey Do" (Shridhar Solanki, Sidh Solanki, Trucks)
"Easy" (HP Aaserud, Geir Luedy, Trucks)
"Lovin' the Laughter" (Shridhar Solanki, HP Aaserud, Geir Luedy, Trucks)
"Fuzz About It" (HP Aaserud, Geir Luedy, Trucks)
"Sad Song" (Shridhar Solanki, HP Aaserud)
"Psychos" (Shridhar Solanki, HP Aaserud, Trucks)
"It's Just Porn Mum" "(Shridhar Solanki, HP Aaserud)
"The Chasers" (Shridhar Solanki, HP Aaserud, Geir Luedy, Trucks)
"I'm Okay" (Shridhar Solanki, HP Aaserud,Trucks)
"Coming Over" (HP Aaserud, Geir Luedy, Trucks)

Many promo versions of the album were released, including songs not to be featured on the main album itself, such as a cover version of The Tom Robinson Band's hit, "2-4-6-8 Motorway".

Singles

References

British pop punk groups